Malletiidae is a family of bivalves in the order Nuculanida.

Taxonomy
 Adrana
 Adrana egregia (Guppy, 1882) 
 Adrana electa (A. Adams, 1846) 
 Adrana elizabethae Ortea & Espinosa, 2001 
 Adrana gloriosa (A. Adams, 1855) 
 Adrana patagonica (d’Orbigny, 1846)
 Adrana scaphoides Rehder, 1939 
 Adrana tellinoides G. B. Sowerby I, 1823 
 Austrotindaria Fleming, 1948
 Austrotindaria benthicola Dell, 1956
 Austrotindaria flemingi Dell, 1956
 Austrotindaria wrighti Fleming, 1948
 Katadesmia Dall, 1908
 Katadesmia cuneata (Jeffreys, 1876)
 Katadesmia kolthoffi Haag, 1904 
 Malletia des Moulins 1832
 Malletia abyssopolaris A. H. Clarke, 1960
 Malletia abyssorum A. E. Verrill & Bush, 1898
 Malletia bermudensis Haas, 1949
 Malletia chilensis Moulins, 1832 
 Malletia concentrica
 Malletia cumingii (Hanley, 1860)
 Malletia cuneata 
 Malletia dilatata Philippi, 1844
 Malletia gigantea 
 Malletia grasslei 
 Malletia hyadesi 
 Malletia inequalis 
 Malletia johnsoni 
 Malletia magellanica 
 Malletia malita
 Malletia obtusa G. O. Sars, 1872
 Malletia pallida
 Malletia pellucida
 Malletia polita A. E. Verrill & Bush, 1898
 Malletia subaequalis
 Malletia surinamenis
 Malletia veneriformis E. A. Smith, 1885
 Malletiella Soot-Ryen 1957
 Minormalletia Dall, 1908
 Neilo A. Adams, 1854
 Neilo australis (Quoy and Gaimard, 1835)
 Neilo rugata Dell, 1956
 Pseudoglomus
 Pseudoglomus pompholyx (Dall, 1890)
 Pseudomalletia Fischer, 1886

References
 Powell A. W. B., New Zealand Mollusca, William Collins Publishers Ltd, Auckland, New Zealand 1979 

 
Bivalve families